Afghan Times is an Afghan Christian internet News Network with daily news from Afghanistan and the Afghan Christians inside and outside Afghanistan.

Description
The editor of this news group is Hussain Andaryas  who himself is a Muslim convert to Christianity.
This news group is operated from the United States and is located in the state of Tennessee.

The Afghan Times brought the attention of the International media towards the arrest of the Afghan Christian, Abdul Rahman who was being prosecuted in Kabul for converting to Christianity and if convicted could face the death penalty. He was eventually released for what was said were mental illness reasons.

References

External links
 Afghan Times 

Afghan news websites
Christian websites
American news websites
American religious websites